Chun-ja is a Korean feminine given name.

Hanja and meaning
The name Chun-ja is generally written with hanja meaning "spring child", though there are three other characters with the reading "chun" on the South Korean government's list of hanja which may be registered for use in given names. Those same characters may also be read as the Japanese feminine given name Haruko.

Chun-ja is one of a number of Japanese-style names ending in "ja", like Young-ja and Jeong-ja, that were popular when Korea was under Japanese rule, but declined in popularity afterwards. According to South Korean government data, Chun-ja was the fourth-most popular name for newborn girls in 1945, with nine out of the top ten names for girls that year ending in "ja". However, by 1950 there were no names ending in "ja" in the top ten.

People
People with this name include:
Ryom Chun-ja (born 1942), North Korean volleyball player
Ryoo Choon-za (born 1943), North Korean speed skater
Chunja (singer), stage name of Hong Su-yeon (born 1979), South Korean singer

See also
List of Korean given names
Chunja's Happy Events, 2008 South Korean television series

References

Korean feminine given names